İpsala is a town and district of Edirne Province in northwestern Turkey.  It is the location of one of the main border checkpoints between Greece and Turkey. (The Greek town opposite İpsala is Kipoi.) The population is 8,332 (the city) and 30,112 (whole district).

The state road  (European route ) connects the border checkpoint İpsala with Tekirdağ at the coast of Marmara Sea.

History 

In Roman and Byzantine times, this was the town of Cypsela, which belonged to the Roman province of Rhodope, whose capital and metropolitan see was Traianopolis. 

From the 7th century onward, the bishopric of Cypsela, initially a suffragan of Traianopolis, appears in the Notitiae Episcopatuum as an autocephalous archdiocese. Its bishops Georgius and Theophylactus were present respectively at the Second Council of Constantinople (553) and the Second Council of Nicaea (787). Stephanus was at both the Council of Constantinople (869) and the Council of Constantinople (879). No longer a residential bishopric, Cypsela is today listed by the Catholic Church as a titular see.

References

Greece–Turkey border crossings
Populated places in Edirne Province
İpsala District
Towns in Turkey